Persian may refer to:

 People and things from Iran, historically called Persia in the English language
 Persians, the majority ethnic group in Iran, not to be conflated with the Iranic peoples
 Persian language, an Iranian language of the Indo-European family, native language of ethnic Persians
 Persian alphabet, a writing system based on the Arabic script
 People and things from the historical Persian Empire

Other uses
 Persian (patience), a card game
 Persian (roll), a pastry native to Thunder Bay, Ontario
 Persian (wine)
 Persian, Indonesia, on the island of Java
 Persian cat, a long-haired breed of cat characterized by its round face and shortened muzzle
 The Persian, a character from Gaston Leroux's The Phantom of the Opera
 Persian, a generation I Pokémon species
 Alpha Indi, star also known as "The Persian"

See also
 Persian Empire (disambiguation)
 Persian expedition (disambiguation) or Persian campaign
 Persian Gulf (disambiguation)
 Persian invasion (disambiguation)
 Persian music (disambiguation)
 Persian Sea (disambiguation)
 Persian War (disambiguation)
 
 Persia (disambiguation)
 Farsi (disambiguation)
 Parsi (disambiguation)
 Iranian (disambiguation)
 List of Persia-related topics
 List of Persian-language poets and authors

Language and nationality disambiguation pages